Newgate is a British company that design and manufacture clocks and watches stocked and sold in boutique home stores and high end department stores around the world. Newgate is known for its vintage, industrial, retro and mid-century style designs. Products include men's and women's watches, alarm clocks, mantel clocks, wall clocks and outdoor clocks. The company also designs and makes clocks for other brands.

Background
Newgate was founded in 1991 by the current owners Jim and Chloe Read from the spare room of their apartment. The name came from the old New Gate Toll adjacent to the Read's apartment and first home in Oswestry. Jim had just been kicked out of art college when he met Chloe. They moved in together and sold their vintage Mini Moke car to fund the purchase of second hand machinery to start making framed art. Quite by accident they bought some quartz clock movements, which they fitted to the dials they painted and mounted in frames and cases. The clocks were first seen at a trade exhibition at London's Alexandra Palace where orders for clocks were received from Harrods, dozens of home stores and several European distributors.

In the 1990s, 75 percent of the clocks produced were exported around the world. The clocks were all manufactured in the Oswestry factory until 2003 when production moved to Asia, benefiting from lower manufacturing costs and higher production capacities.

The decision to create a fusion brand called Jones Clocks was made in 2005. Jones Clocks is a fashion clock brand, and its products are sold to supermarkets and large home and DIY centres.

In 2009, the company purchased a large ex Laura Ashley factory in Oswestry that required refurbishment to include new facilities, offices and showrooms, which were built in a classic style and furnished with original 1940s furniture throughout. The building also houses Newgate's design studios and its comprehensive collection of industrial and vintage clocks.

In 2012, work started on a range of watches. The Newgate Watch collection took three years to come to fruition when a range of fifty watches was launched at the Spring Fair in Birmingham, UK, in February 2015. The UK watch trade publication WatchPro featured Newgate Watch founders Jim and Chloe Read in the Trailblazer category of the WatchPro Hot 100 of 2016.

A portfolio of short films were made in 2015 to showcase each watch and clock family.

References

External links
Official Site

Clock manufacturing companies of the United Kingdom
Companies based in Shropshire
British brands
British companies established in 1991